Raphaël Wicky (born 26 April 1977) is a Swiss football coach and a former player. He is currently the manager of Swiss Super League club BSC Young Boys. He was a defensive midfielder who could also play in defence and was known for his combative style.

His playing career was spent mostly in the German Bundesliga with Werder Bremen and Hamburg, as well as a brief spell in Spain's Segunda División with Atlético Madrid. He earned 75 caps for Switzerland between 1996 and 2008, playing at two European Championships and the 2006 FIFA World Cup.

As a manager, he won the Swiss Super League and Swiss Cup double with Basel in 2017, and also spent two years in Major League Soccer with the Chicago Fire.

Club career
Born in Leuggern in the canton of Aargau, Wicky started his career with FC Sion, and went on to represent Werder Bremen. n 25 January 2001, he joined Atlético Madrid, then in the Segunda División.

After only 11 games in Spain, he returned to the Bundesliga on 6 December 2001, signing for Hamburger SV until the end of the season with the option to extend until June 2005. He returned to Sion on a three-year contract on 23 August 2007, after losing first-choice status with Hamburg under manager Huub Stevens following a period of injury.

Wicky signed on a free transfer with Los Angeles-based Major League Soccer side Chivas USA in February 2008. Wicky made his debut as a substitute in Chivas' season opener against FC Dallas on 30 March. His season was cut short due to ankle injury, making just five appearances in his first MLS season. He underwent surgery to repair the injury in July 2008 and was placed on the team's season-ending injury list on 15 September.

On 26 January 2009, Chivas USA announced that they had re-signed Wicky to a one-year deal. Five weeks later, on 3 March, he announced his retirement from professional football, citing "personal reasons."

International career
Internationally, Wicky was part of the Swiss national teams at Euro 96 and Euro 2004 as well as at the 2006 World Cup.

In 75 appearances, he scored one goal, to open a 3–1 win away to the Faroe Islands in qualification for the last of those tournaments on 4 June 2005.

International goals
Scores and results list Switzerland's goal tally first, score column indicates score after each Wicky goal.

Managerial career
Upon retiring, Wicky coached the youth teams of FC Thun in 2009 and a year later Servette.

In 2013, he moved into the youth ranks of FC Basel. He became first-team manager on 21 April 2017, replacing Urs Fischer after a boardroom change. Days later, the team wrapped up an eighth consecutive league title, and on 25 May won the Swiss Cup with a 3–0 victory over FC Sion at the Stade de Genève. On 26 July 2018, having finished as runner-up in the domestic league and having been eliminated in the semifinal of the cup as well as having started the new season poorly, with elimination by PAOK in the 2nd qualifying round of the Champions League, he was sacked.

On 8 March 2019, Wicky was named the head coach of the United States Under-17 Men's National Team. On 27 December 2019, he was named the head coach of Major League Soccer side Chicago Fire.  He missed the MLS Cup playoffs by one point in 2020, and was fired on 30 September 2021.

On 2 June 2022, his return to the Swiss Super League as the new head coach of BSC Young Boys was announced.

Managerial statistics

Honours

Player
FC Sion
Swiss Championship: 1996–97
Swiss Cup: 1994–95, 1995–96, 1996–97

Werder Bremen
 DFB-Pokal: 1998–99; finalist 1999–2000
 DFB-Ligapokal finalist: 1999
 UEFA Intertoto Cup: 1998

Hamburger SV
 DFB-Ligapokal: 2003
 UEFA Intertoto Cup: 2005
 Bundesliga third place: 2005–06

References

External links

 

1977 births
Living people
Swiss-German people
People from Zurzach District
Association football midfielders
Swiss men's footballers
Switzerland international footballers
FC Sion players
SV Werder Bremen players
Atlético Madrid footballers
Hamburger SV players
Chivas USA players
Swiss Super League players
Segunda División players
Bundesliga players
Major League Soccer players
UEFA Euro 1996 players
UEFA Euro 2004 players
2006 FIFA World Cup players
Expatriate footballers in Spain
Expatriate footballers in Germany
Expatriate soccer players in the United States
Swiss expatriate sportspeople in Germany
Swiss expatriate sportspeople in Spain
Swiss expatriate sportspeople in the United States
Swiss football managers
FC Basel managers
Chicago Fire FC coaches
Major League Soccer coaches
Swiss expatriate football managers
Expatriate soccer managers in the United States
Sportspeople from Aargau
BSC Young Boys managers